Pseudominolia splendens is a species of sea snail, a marine gastropod mollusk in the family Trochidae.

Description
The height of the shell attains 11 mm. This shining shell with red spots has a depressed-orbicular shape and is smooth below. The gradate, conical spire has an acute apex. It contains 6½ whorls with spirally granulated lirae. The body whorl has a depressed rotund shape. On top it shows an angle, below it is rotund. The body whorl contains seven lirae, the upper ones granulated, the others plane. The shell has a wide and deep umbilicus.. It contains seven ridges above the periphery, the upper ridges being beaded. The base of the shell is convex. The aperture is slightly oblique and subquadrate. The oblique columella has a slight callus.

Distribution
This species occurs in the Indian Ocean off Madagascar and off KwaZuluNatal, South Africa.

References

 Herbert D.G. (1992). Revision of the Umboniinae (Mollusca: Prosobranchia: Trochidae) in southern Africa and Mozambique. Annals of the Natal Museum 33(2):379–459

External links
 

splendens
Gastropods described in 1897